John Laughlin (born April 3, 1956), sometimes credited as John C. McLaughlin or John McLaughlin, is an American film and television actor.

Career
Since 1978, he has appeared in over 25 films and at least 30 television productions.

Filmography

Film

Television

References

External links
 
 "Love Comes Softly Film #3: Love's Abiding Joy with Erin Cottrell, Logan Bartholomew, James Tupper" article

1956 births
American male film actors
American male television actors
Living people